Milimar is a historic home located in Silver Spring, Montgomery County, Maryland, United States. Milimar is a -story brick house that is Georgian in style. The house is believed to have been built by Henry Lazenby II, a descendant of a family which came to Maryland at the very beginning of the 18th century.

Milimar was listed on the National Register of Historic Places in 1973.

References

External links
, including photo in 2003, at Maryland Historical Trust website

Colesville, Maryland
Houses on the National Register of Historic Places in Maryland
Houses completed in 1790
Houses in Montgomery County, Maryland
Georgian architecture in Maryland
National Register of Historic Places in Montgomery County, Maryland